Boulton Paul Aircraft Ltd was a British aircraft manufacturer that was incorporated in 1934, although its origins in aircraft manufacturing began earlier in 1914, and lasted until 1961. The company mainly built and modified aircraft under contract to other manufacturers, but had a few notable designs of its own, such as the Defiant fighter and the Balliol trainer.

The company's origins date back to an ironmonger's shop founded in 1797 in Norwich. By the early 1900s, Boulton & Paul Ltd was a successful general manufacturing firm with a construction engineering division. It began building aircraft under contract during the First World War before moving into designing and building its own aircraft. 

The aircraft building business was sold off - at a low point in the aviation market - from the main construction business in 1934 and then moved to Wolverhampton under its new name Boulton Paul Aircraft Ltd in 1936 to take advantage of skilled local workforce and local government incentives.

By 1961 Boulton Paul Aircraft was a manufacturer of aircraft equipment rather than aircraft, it merged with the Dowty Group.

History 

Boulton & Paul started its construction engineering division in 1905.

In 1915, Boulton & Paul began to construct aircraft under contract, including 550 of the Royal Aircraft Factory FE.2b. During the war the company built more Sopwith Camels than any other manufacturer. Success as an aircraft builder led the company to form a design department but none of its resulting aircraft made a significant impact while the war lasted. Boulton Paul's chief aircraft designer was John Dudley North (1893–1968), who joined the company from Austin Motor Company Aircraft Department.

After World War I, Boulton & Paul made their mark with the introduction of powered and enclosed defensive machine gun turrets for bombers. Their Sidestrand twin-engined biplane bomber, which could fly at 140 mph, had an exposed nose turret which was clearly inadequate. The subsequent Overstrand bomber featured the world's first enclosed, power-operated turret, mounting a single Lewis gun and propelled by compressed air. The company licensed a French design of an electro-hydraulic four-gun turret which became a major feature of their future production. In addition to fitting turrets to bombers, Boulton Paul was to install them in fighters.

During this period Boulton & Paul continued to operate outside the aircraft industry as well. They manufactured equipment such as machine tools and stationary engines. The latter were also available coupled to a dynamo for powering electric lighting circuits, and were sold under the Electolite brand name.

In 1934, Boulton & Paul sold their "Aircraft Department" which became Boulton Paul Aircraft Ltd. Over the next couple of years a new factory site was built up in Wolverhampton. This gave access to a large skilled workforce on top of the 600 or so employees that left Norwich for Wolverhampton. Even so, Boulton Paul would later set up a training centre in Scotland to bring in extra workers. The first "turret" fighter to be built was the Hawker Demon. This was followed by Boulton Paul's most famous aircraft, the Defiant, which was a revolutionary but flawed concept specified by the Air Ministry – a "fast" fighter with no fixed forward armament but a powerful four-gun dorsal turret. Turret fighters were expected to be able to engage enemy bombers from any aspect. The same concept was used for the Defiant's naval equivalent, the Blackburn Roc, which while a design by Blackburn, the detail design was done in BP's drawing office and the aircraft was built wholly by Boulton Paul.

Boulton Paul also built the Fairey Barracuda and did conversions of the Vickers Wellington. The only post-war design was the Balliol advanced trainer, of which 229 were built, including 30 as the Sea Balliol deck-landing trainer.

In the jet age, Boulton Paul worked on the English Electric Canberra and de Havilland Vampire. It designed and built a couple of delta-wing jet-engined aircraft for research work and continued to tender designs for official requirements. In 1961 the company was acquired by Dowty Group and was renamed Dowty Boulton Paul Ltd and then Dowty Aerospace.

Following the acquisition of Dowty Aerospace by TI Group in 1992, and the subsequent merger of Smiths Industries and the TI group in 2000, to form Smiths Group, the Wolverhampton factory site was sold again in May 2007 to GE Aviation Systems. Yet again in August 2009 the factory was sold to Moog Inc. but was to move to new premises at the nearby I54 business park. The factory also had an on-site Boulton Paul Museum dedicated to Boulton Paul aircraft and the traditional methods used to manufacture aircraft. The important collection was scheduled to move to Royal Air Force Museum Cosford in Spring 2013. Short video of the move captured April 28,2013 .

Boulton Paul aircraft (including pre 1934 aircraft)
First flight date shown
 Boulton Paul Bobolink 1918
 Boulton Paul Bourges 1918
 Boulton Paul P-6 1918
 Boulton Paul Atlantic 1919
 Boulton Paul P.9 1919
 Boulton Paul P.10 1919
 Boulton Paul Bolton 1922
 Boulton & Paul Bugle 1923
 Boulton Paul Bodmin 1924
 Boulton Paul Sidestrand 1926 – bomber
 Boulton Paul Bittern 1927 – night fighter with upward firing guns
 Boulton Paul Partridge 1928 – fighter
 Boulton Paul Phoenix 1929 – low cost aeroplane for personal use
 Boulton Paul P.32 1931 – bomber, not accepted for service
 Boulton Paul Overstrand 1933 – bomber
 Boulton Paul P.64 Mail-Carrier 1933
 Boulton Paul P.71A 1934 – transport derivative of the Mailplane
 Boulton Paul Defiant 1937 – turret fighter
 Boulton Paul P.90 Proposal for a four-engined bomber, to meet Specification B.12/36. Not built.
 Boulton Paul P.92 1941 – fighter/ground attack
 Boulton Paul P.98/P.100 1942 – proposed canard-pushprop design
 Boulton Paul Balliol 1947 – trainer
 Boulton Paul P.111 1950 – delta wing research
 Boulton Paul P.112 1950s – proposed three seat training aircraft, not built
 Boulton Paul P.116 1950s – proposed two seat training aircraft, not built
 Boulton Paul P.117 wing controlled aerodyne
 Boulton Paul P.120 1952 – delta wing research
 Boulton Paul P.130 proposed VTOL aircraft
 Boulton Paul P.132 proposed VTOL aircraft
 Boulton Paul P.134 proposed VTOL aircraft
 Boulton Paul P.135 proposed VTOL aircraft
 Boulton Paul P.136 proposed VTOL aircraft
 Boulton Paul P.137 VTOL research aircraft
 Boulton Paul P.140 proposed VTOL airliner
 Boulton Paul P.141 proposed VTOL airliner
 Boulton Paul P.142 VTOL research aircraft
 Boulton Paul P.143 proposed VTOL airliner
 Boulton Paul P.145 proposed VTOL twin-boom aircraft
 Boulton Paul P.146 proposed VTOL airliner

Missiles 
 UB.109T – Company designation Boulton-Paul P.123 .

Boulton Paul gun turrets 

Boulton Paul was one of the two main innovators of gun turret designs for British aircraft, along with Nash & Thompson; they supplied large numbers of installations for British aircraft.  Boulton Paul's designs were largely based on originals licensed from the French company SAMM (Société d'Applications des Machines Motrices), while Nash & Thompson concentrated on the FN designs originated by the firm's co-founder, Archibald Frazer-Nash.
Boulton Paul's turrets were electro-hydraulic in operation; electric motors located in the turret drove hydraulic pumps that powered hydraulic motors and rams. This was more effective than electric motors alone, and did not require power developed by the aircraft's engines as did the hydraulic system utilized by the Nash & Thompson design. Production was transferred to Joseph Lucas Ltd.

Turret models:
 Type A
 Mark II Used on Boulton Paul Defiant (D) and Blackburn Roc (R)
 Mark VIII Four gun or two gun turret, dorsal on Handley Page Halifax
 Also used on Lockheed Ventura, and for converting Short C and G class flying boats
 Type B
 Type C
 Mark I, two guns used as nose turret on Halifax
 Mark II, two guns used as dorsal turret on Halifax
 Used on Lockheed Hudson
 Type D
 Two 0.5-in (12.7 mm) guns
 Used on some Avro Lincoln as tail turret, some fitted with Automatic Gun-Laying Turret radar equipment
 Type E
 Four .303 (7.7 mm) gun rear turret used on Halifax and some versions of Consolidated B-24 Liberator
 Type K
 Ventral design, two gun retractable used on Halifax
 Type N
 Nose design for Lincoln
 Type R
 Ventral, two .303 (7.7 mm) guns with periscope sighting

See also

References

Citations

Bibliography

 
 
 Boulton and Paul Norwich Heritage Economic and Regeneration Trust

External links 
 Boulton Paul – British Aircraft Directory
 Boulton Paul Wolverhampton local history
 History of Boulton and Paul in Norwich
 Archive images from the Express & Star

Defunct aircraft manufacturers of the United Kingdom
Companies based in Norwich
Manufacturing companies based in Wolverhampton
Vehicle manufacturing companies established in 1934
History of Norwich
1934 establishments in the United Kingdom